The National Institute of Statistics (INS) is an agency of the government of Cameroon. Its head office is in the centre of Yaoundé, in front of the Immeuble rose.

References

External links

 National Institute of Statistics 

Cameroon
Government of Cameroon